Colzate is a comune (municipality) in the Province of Bergamo in the Italian region of Lombardy, located about  northeast of Milan and about  northeast of Bergamo.

The municipality of Colzate contains the frazioni (subdivisions, mainly villages and hamlets) Bondo di Colzate and Piani di Rezzo.

Colzate borders the following municipalities: Casnigo, Gorno, Oneta, Vertova.

Demographic evolution

References